Marker 32 is a coral reef located within the Florida Keys National Marine Sanctuary.  It lies to the south of Key West, and is between Western Sambo reef and 9-Foot Stake reef.  Unlike many reefs in the Sanctuary, it is not within a Sanctuary Preservation Area (SPA).

The reef is close to navigational marker 32.

Gallery

References
 NOAA National Marine Sanctuary Maps, Florida Keys East
 NOAA Map of buoys at Marker 32
 NOAA Navigational Chart 11441

Coral reefs of the Florida Keys